Pedobacter insulae is a species of bacteria. It is Gram-negative, non-motile and rod-shaped, with type strain DS-139(T) (=KCTC 12820(T) =DSM 18684(T)).

References

Further reading
Whitman, William B., et al., eds. Bergey's manual® of systematic bacteriology. Vol. 5. Springer, 2012.
Fulthorpe, Roberta R., et al. "Distantly sampled soils carry few species in common." The ISME Journal 2.9 (2008): 901–910.

External links

LPSN
Type strain of Pedobacter insulae at BacDive -  the Bacterial Diversity Metadatabase

Sphingobacteriia
Bacteria described in 2007